Manuela Campanelli may refer to:

 Manuela Campanelli (science journalist)
 Manuela Campanelli (scientist)